The first series of The Only Way Is Essex, a British semi-reality television series, began airing on 10 October 2010 on ITV2. The series concluded on 10 November 2010 after ten episodes. An Essexmas special aired on 24 December 2010 and is included on the Series 1 DVD. This is the first series to include cast members Amy Childs, Billie and Sam Faiers, Harry Derbidge, James "Arg" Argent, Jess and Mark Wright, Kirk Norcross, Lauren Goodger, Lauren Pope, Lucy Mecklenburgh, Lydia Bright, Maria Fowler and Patricia "Nanny Pat" Brooker, and the only series to feature Candy Jacobs and Michael Woods. The series focused heavily on the aftermath of Mark and Lauren G's break-up and his attempts to get over her by turning to both Lucy and Sam. It also featured Arg trying to win back his ex-girlfriend Lydia, and Kirk's brief romance with Amy before getting with Lauren P.

Cast

Episodes

{| class="wikitable plainrowheaders" style="width:100%; background:#fff;"
|-style="color:white"
! style="background:#6991FF;"| SeriesNo.
! style="background:#6991FF;"| SeasonNo.
! style="background:#6991FF;"| Title
! style="background:#6991FF;"| Original airdate
! style="background:#6991FF;"| Duration
! style="background:#6991FF;"| UK viewers

|}

Ratings

External links

References

The Only Way Is Essex
2010 British television seasons